Coleophora eupepla is a moth of the family Coleophoridae. It is found in Turkey, Russia, Hungary, North Macedonia, Greece, France and Spain.

The larvae possibly feed on Onobrychis viciifolia.

References

Eupepla
Moths described in 1954
Moths of Europe